In the 1901 Iowa State Senate elections Iowa voters elected state senators in 21 of the state senate's 50 districts. State senators traditionally serve four-year terms in the Iowa State Senate. However, under the Biennial Elections law enacted in 1904 by the Iowa General Assembly, the senators elected in 1901 served an additional fifth year (until the 1906 elections) to accommodate the transition to holding elections on even-numbered years.

A statewide map of the 50 state Senate districts in the 1901 elections is provided by the Iowa General Assembly here.

The 1901 elections occurred before primary elections were established in Iowa by the Primary Election Law in 1907. The general election took place on November 5, 1901.

Following the previous election, Republicans had control of the Iowa Senate with 35 seats to Democrats' 15 seats.

To claim control of the chamber from Republicans, the Democrats needed to net 11 Senate seats.

Republicans maintained control of the Iowa State Senate following the 1901 general election with the balance of power shifting to Republicans holding 39 seats and Democrats having 11 seats (a net gain of 4 seats for Republicans). However, during the twenty-ninth session of the Iowa General Assembly, the senators decided in March 1902 to decertify Democrat Joseph Martin Emmert of district eighteen and replace Emmert with Republican James E. Bruce, thus flipping the seat from Democratic to Republican control. Therefore, Republicans held an advantage of 40 seats to Democrats' 10 seats in 1902 following the installation of Mr. Bruce.

Summary of Results
Note: The 29 holdover Senators not up for re-election are not listed on this table.

Source:

Detailed Results
NOTE: The 29 districts that did not hold elections in 1901 are not listed here.

District 1

District 7

District 9

District 10

District 12

District 13

District 18

J. M. Emmert received certificate of election. James E. Bruce contested the election of Mr. Emmert and the Senate, on March 14, 1902, decided the contest in favor of Mr. Bruce. Therefore, Mr. Emmert was unseated and Mr. Bruce was installed.

District 20

District 21

District 22

District 29

District 30

District 34

District 35

District 37

District 38

District 42

District 44

District 45

District 48

District 50

See also
 Elections in Iowa

References

Iowa Senate
Iowa
Iowa Senate elections